"Tryin' to Get the Feeling Again" is a song written by David Pomeranz that became a top 10 hit for Barry Manilow in 1976. It was first recorded by the Carpenters in 1975, but their version was not released until 1994 on their 25th anniversary CD, Interpretations: A 25th Anniversary Celebration. Pomeranz also recorded the song for his 1975 album It's in Every One of Us (Arista Records).

Barry Manilow version
Manilow released his recording, a single from the album Tryin' to Get the Feeling, in 1976. It charted in the top ten on the Billboard Hot 100, peaking at number 10. His take also hit number 1 on the Adult Contemporary chart. An alternate version, including the original bridge, nearly a minute longer, appears on The Complete Collection and Then Some.... Manilow says the bridge was eliminated in his release for timing reasons, but he tries to include it when performing live 

Record World said that "this lush ballad will speak directly to a large audience."

Chart performance

Weekly charts

Year-end charts

Carpenters' version

The Carpenters' version of "Tryin' to Get the Feeling Again" was recorded during the Horizon sessions in 1975, but it had been shelved as being "one too many ballads".  Years later, Richard was looking for the master backing track for "Only Yesterday" and discovered on that same tape the lost, earlier attempt at "Tryin' to Get the Feeling Again" with Karen's "work lead". (A work lead can easily be identified by such anomalies as Karen flipping a sheet of paper over at about 1:50 into the play time of the song as she sight reads and sings.) Richard felt that the vocal was good enough to finish production and release the song, as he did in 1994, almost 20 years after it was recorded. The Carpenters version includes the original bridge.

Personnel
Karen Carpenter – lead and backing vocals
Richard Carpenter – backing vocals, keyboards
Joe Osborn – bass guitar
Jim Gordon – drums
Tim May – guitar

Original David Pomeranz version
Pomeranz wrote the song during a time of stress in his marriage, referring to its ups and downs. He notes that he rewrote the song several times, and that his version, the Manilow version, and the Carpenters version each include different verses.

Additional versions
Gene Pitney, 1975, Pitney '75 (Bronze)
Stephanie De-Sykes, 1975, (single, 20th Century)
Hubert Laws (flute), 1976, Romeo & Juliet (Columbia)
Dee Dee Sharp Gamble, 1977, What Color Is Love (Philadelphia International)

See also
List of number-one adult contemporary singles of 1976 (U.S.)

References
CD insert – Interpretations

External links
 

1975 songs
1976 singles
Barry Manilow songs
1994 singles
The Carpenters songs
Arista Records singles
A&M Records singles
Songs written by David Pomeranz
Song recordings produced by Ron Dante